The Minister of Transport is a cabinet member in the Government of France. The position was created in 1870 as a modification to the position of Minister of Public Works (Ministre des Travaux Publics) (1830–1870). It has frequently been combined with the position of Minister of Public Works (Ministre de l'Équipement), Minister of Housing (Logement), Minister of Tourism, Minister of Territorial Development (Aménagement du territoire), and Minister of the Sea.

Following the election of Nicolas Sarkozy as President of France in May 2006, the Ministry of Transport was absorbed by the Ministry of Ecology, Energy, Sustainable Development, and Territorial Development. It is now known as the Ministry of the Environment, Energy, and the Sea. 

The post has a subordinate role within the department, with a junior minister attending Cabinet meetings as roughly equivalent to a Minister of State in Commonwealth countries.

Ministers of Transport (or equivalent) since 1870
3 September 2019 – present: Jean-Baptiste Djebbari
17 May 2017 – 16 July 2019 : Élisabeth Borne
26 August 2014 – 10 May 2017 : Alain Vidalies (Secretary of State for Transport, the Sea and Fisheries)
16 May 2012 – 25 August 2014 : Frédéric Cuvillier (Minister for Transport and the Maritime Economy, later Secretary of State for Transport, the Sea and Fisheries)
14 November 2010 – 10 May 2012 : Thierry Mariani (Secretary of State for Transport, later Minister for Transport)
2 June 2005 – 13 November 2010 : Dominique Bussereau (as Secretary of State for Transport)
7 May 2002 – 2 June 2005: Gilles de Robien
4 June 1997 –  7 May 2002: Jean-Claude Gayssot         
18 May 1995 –  4 June 1997: Bernard Pons                    
29 March 1993 – 18 May 1995: Bernard Bosson                    
2 April 1992 – 29 March 1993: Jean-Louis Bianco                 
15 May 1991 –  2 April 1992: Paul Quilès          
21 December 1990 – 15 May 1991: Louis Besson                     
23 June 1988 – 21 December 1990: Michel Delebarre                 
10 May 1988 – 23 June 1988: Louis Mermaz     
20 March 1986 – 10 May 1988: Pierre Méhaignerie                  
20 September 1985 – 20 March 1986: Jean Auroux                       
17 July 1984 – 20 September 1985: Paul Quilès             
22 June 1981 – 17 July 1984: Charles Fiterman                  
21 May 1981 – 22 June 1981: Louis Mermaz           
2 October 1980 – 21 May 1981: Daniel Hoeffel
3 April 1978 –  2 October 1980: Joël Le Theule                     
2 April 1973 – 27 February 1974: Yves Guéna                       
5 July 1972 –  2 April 1973: Robert Galley                     
7 January 1971 –  5 July 1972: Jean Chamant            
22 June 1969 – 31 December 1970: Raymond Mondon
6 April 1967 – 22 June 1969: Jean Chamant           
28 November 1962 –  6 April 1967: Marc Jacquet
15 May 1962 – 28 November 1962: Roger Dusseaulx
9 June 1958 – 15 May 1962: Robert Buron                     
3 June 1958 –  9 June 1958: Antoine Pinay
13 June 1957 –  1 June 1958: Édouard Bonnefous              
23 February 1955 –  1 February 1956: Édouard Corniglion-Molinier 
3 September 1954 – 23 February 1955: Jacques Chaban-Delmas  
14 August 1954 –  3 September 1954: Maurice Bourgès-Maunoury
19 June 1954 – 14 August 1954: Jacques Chaban-Delmas
28 June 1953 – 19 June 1954: Jacques Chastellain
8 March 1952 – 28 June 1953: André Morice  
12 July 1950 –  8 March 1952: Antoine Pinay 
2 July 1950 – 12 July 1950: Maurice Bourgès-Maunoury
7 February 1950 –  2 July 1950: Jacques Chastellain
11 September 1948 –  7 February 1950: Christian Pineau      
5 September 1948 – 11 September 1948: Henri Queuille                     
24 November 1947 –  5 September 1948: Christian Pineau    
21 November 1945 – 24 November 1947: Jules Moch             
10 September 1944 – 21 November 1945: René Mayer                      
9 November 1943 – 10 September 1944: René Mayer(Commissaire)
27 June 1940 – 12 July 1940: Ludovic-Oscar Frossard         
16 June 1940 – 27 June 1940: Ludovic-Oscar Frossard       
5 June 1940 – 16 June 1940: Ludovic-Oscar Frossard 
23 August 1938 –  5 June 1940: Anatole de Monzie      
10 April 1938 – 23 August 1938: Ludovic-Oscar Frossard
13 March 1938 – 10 April 1938: Jules Moch              
22 June 1937 – 13 March 1938: Henri Queuille                     
4 June 1936 – 22 June 1937: Albert Bedouce                   
24 January 1936 –  4 June 1936: Camille Chautemps    
7 June 1935 – 24 January 1936: Laurent Eynac                      
1 June 1935 –  7 June 1935: Joseph Paganon         
8 November 1934 –  1 June 1935: Henri Roy                          
9 February 1934 –  8 November 1934: Pierre Étienne Flandin            
31 January 1933 –  9 February 1934: Joseph Paganon          
18 December 1932 – 31 January 1933: Georges Bonnet                     
3 June 1932 – 18 December 1932: Édouard Daladier     
20 February 1932 –  3 June 1932: Charles Guernier                  
27 January 1931 – 20 February 1932: Maurice Deligne                    
13 December 1930 – 27 January 1931: Édouard Daladier        
2 December 1930 – 13 December 1930: Georges Pernot         
21 February 1930 –  2 March 1930: Édouard Daladier        
3 November 1929 – 21 February 1930: Georges Pernot         
11 November 1928 –  3 November 1929: Pierre Forgeot                   
23 July 1926 – 11 November 1928: André Tardieu                     
19 July 1926 – 23 July 1926: Orly André-Hesse
23 June 1926 – 19 July 1926: Charles Daniel-Vincent             
29 October 1925 – 23 June 1926: Anatole de Monzie     
17 April 1925 – 29 October 1925: Pierre Laval                      
14 June 1924 – 17 April 1925: Victor Peytral                   
29 March 1924 – 14 June 1924: Yves Le Trocquer                   
20 January 1920 – 29 March 1924: Yves Le Trocquer                    
5 May 1919 – 20 January 1920: Albert Claveille
12 September 1917 –  5 May 1919: Albert Claveille
20 March 1917 – 12 September 1917: Georges Desplas                    
12 December 1916 – 20 March 1917: Édouard Herriot                  
26 August 1914 – 12 December 1916: Marcel Sembat                   
13 June 1914 – 26 August 1914: René Renoult                     
9 June 1914 – 13 June 1914: Jean Dupuy        
9 December 1913 –  9 June 1914: Fernand David 
22 March 1913 –  9 December 1913: Joseph Thierry   
14 January 1912 – 22 March 1913: Jean Dupuy
27 June 1911 – 14 January 1912: Victor Augagneur  
2 March 1911 – 27 June 1911: Charles Dumont
3 November 1910 –  2 March 1911: Louis Puech   
24 July 1909 –  3 November 1910: Alexandre Millerand
14 March 1906 – 24 July 1909: Louis Barthou
24 January 1905 – 14 March 1906: Armand Gauthier de l'Aude 
7 June 1902 – 24 January 1905: Émile Maruéjouls     
22 June 1899 –  7 June 1902: Pierre Baudin                 
6 May 1899 – 22 June 1899: Jean Monestier
1 November 1898 –  6 May 1899: Camille Krantz
17 September 1898 – 1 November 1898: Jules Godin                     
28 June 1898 – 17 September 1898: Louis Tillaye              
29 April 1896 – 28 June 1898: Adolphe Turrel
1 November 1895 – 29 April 1896: Edmond Guyot-Dessaigne    
26 January 1895 –  1 November 1895: Ludovic Dupuy-Dutemps       
30 May 1894 – 13 January 1895: Louis Barthou           
3 December 1893 – 30 May 1894: Charles Jonnart               
27 February 1892 –  3 December 1893: Jules Viette
22 February 1889 – 27 February 1892: Yves Guyot
3 April 1888 – 22 February 1889: Pierre Deluns-Montaud
12 December 1887 –  3 April 1888: Émile Loubet
30 May 1887 – 12 December 1887: Severiano de Heredia
4 November 1886 – 30 May 1887: Édouard Millaud
7 January 1886 –  2 November 1886: Charles Baïhaut
16 April 1885 –  7 January 1886: Charles Demôle
6 April 1885 – 16 April 1885: Sadi Carnot
21 February 1883 –  6 April 1885: David Raynal
10 August 1882 – 21 February 1883: Anne Charles Hérisson
30 January 1882 –  7 August 1882: Henri Varroy
14 November 1881 – 30 January 1882: David Raynal
23 September 1880 – 14 November 1881: Sadi Carnot
28 December 1879 – 23 September 1880: Henri Varroy
13 December 1877 – 28 December 1879: Charles Louis de Saulces de Freycinet
23 November 1877 – 13 December 1877: Michel Graëff
17 May 1877 – 23 November 1877: Auguste Pâris
9 March 1876 – 17 May 1877: Albert Christophle
22 May 1874 –  9 March 1876: Eugène Caillaux
26 November 1873 – 22 May 1874: Charles de Larcy
25 May 1873 – 26 November 1873: Alfred Deseilligny
18 May 1873 – 25 May 1873: René Bérenger
7 December 1872 – 18 May 1873: Oscar Bardi de Fourtou
19 February 1871 –  7 December 1872: Charles de Larcy
4 September 1870 – 19 February 1871: Pierre Frédéric Dorian

See also

 Minister of the Sea (France)

References

 
Transport
Transport in France
1870 establishments in France